"It's Five O'Clock Somewhere" is a song performed by Alan Jackson and Jimmy Buffett, and written by Jim "Moose" Brown and Don Rollins. It was released in June 2003 as the lead single from Jackson's 2003 compilation album Greatest Hits Volume II. It spent eight non-consecutive weeks at #1 on the Billboard Hot Country Songs chart in the summer of 2003, and ranked #4 on the year-end Billboard Hot Country Songs chart. In addition, the song peaked at #17 on the Billboard Hot 100 chart in September 2003, and ranked #65 on the year-end Billboard Hot 100 chart, making it the biggest pop hit for Jackson and the first top forty hit for Buffett since the 1970s.

On November 5, 2003, it also won the Country Music Association (CMA) Award for Vocal Event of the Year. This was Buffett's first award in his 30-year career. The song became the #3 country song of the decade on Billboard's Hot Country Songs Chart.

Content
The title refers to a popular expression used to justify drinking at any time of day, given that somewhere in the world, it is 5:00 p.m., the end of the work day for a traditional "nine-to-five" worker. The narrator states that he has not had a day off in over a year and that he wants to leave work and relieve his stress by drinking alcohol. The lyrics include the phrase, "It's only half-past twelve but I don't care. It's five o'clock somewhere,” which means that even though it is not 5:00 in the narrator's time zone, it must be in another part of the world. 5:00 p.m. is typically the start of 'happy hour' at most restaurants and bars.

History
Jim "Moose" Brown wrote "It's Five O'Clock Somewhere" with Don Rollins. (This is not the same Don Rollins who wrote "The Race Is On" for George Jones in 1963). Although Brown had several other cuts recorded by other artists, this song was the first to make the final cut of an album. The title lyric was inspired by a teacher who worked with Rollins. Brown recorded the demo and offered it to Kenny Chesney, who turned it down. It was then offered to Alan Jackson, who said that he was looking for a song that he could record as a duet with Jimmy Buffett.

Australian Adam Brand and the Outlaws covered the song on the 2016 album Adam Brand and the Outlaws.

Music video
The music video for the song was directed by Trey Fanjoy, and premiered on CMT's "Smash Hits of Country" on June 6, 2003. It was filmed at the Square Grouper Bar in Jupiter, Florida, which would eight years later serve as the location for the video for "Long Way to Go.” It features Jackson performing on a yacht (which he actually owns) called Hullbilly, and later performing at the bar amidst several patrons. When Buffett's chorus comes into play, Jackson walks through a door and joins Buffett on stage at a large concert, which was filmed at Ruoff Music Center in Noblesville, Indiana.

Chart performance
"It's Five O'Clock Somewhere" debuted at number 31 on the U.S. Billboard Hot Country Songs for the week of June 21, 2003. The song held the number 1 position for 7 consecutive weeks, falling to number 2 on the chart dated September 27, 2003, while Dierks Bentley's "What Was I Thinkin'" overtook it at number 1. On the following chart (October 4), Bentley's song fell, allowing "It's Five O'Clock Somewhere" to return to number 1 for an eighth and final week. The song has sold 1,332,000 copies in the US as of April 2014.

When the song reached its eighth week at number one for the week of October 4, 2003, the song tied a record with Lonestar's "Amazed" for having the longest run at number one on the Billboard Hot Country Songs chart since Nielsen Broadcast Data Systems was initiated in 1990. Nineteen years later, this record would be surpassed by Morgan Wallen's "You Proof", which spent ten non-consecutive weeks at number one.

Year-end chart

References

2003 singles
Alan Jackson songs
Jimmy Buffett songs
Male vocal duets
Music videos directed by Trey Fanjoy
Drinking culture
Songs about alcohol
Song recordings produced by Keith Stegall
Arista Nashville singles
2003 songs